Smithia is a genus of flowering plants in the legume family, Fabaceae. It belongs to the subfamily Faboideae, and was recently assigned to the informal monophyletic Dalbergia clade of the Dalbergieae.

Species
Smithia comprises the following species:
 Smithia abyssinica (A. Rich.) Verdc.

 Smithia agharkarii Hemadri

 Smithia bigemina Dalzell
 Smithia blanda Wall.

 Smithia capitata Dalzell

 Smithia ciliata Royle

 Smithia conferta Sm.

 Smithia elliotii Baker f.
 Smithia erubescens (E. Mey.) Baker f.

 Smithia eylesii S. Moore
 Smithia finetii Gagnep.

 Smithia gracilis Benth.

 Smithia grandis Baker
 Smithia hirsuta Dalzell

 Smithia laxiflora Wight & Arn.

 Smithia oligantha Blatt.

 Smithia purpurea Hook.
 Smithia pycnantha Baker

 Smithia salsuginea Hance

 Smithia sensitiva Aiton
 Smithia setulosa Dalzell

 Smithia venkobarowii Gamble

References

Dalbergieae
Fabaceae genera
Taxa named by William Aiton